Lucy is the debut studio album by American folk musician Lucy Wainwright Roche, released on October 26, 2010 on Strike Back Records. Produced by Stewart Lerman, the album features appearances from Roche's father Loudon Wainwright III, The Roches, Steuart Smith, David Mansfield and Kelly Hogan.

Track listing
All tracks written by Lucy Wainwright Roche, except where noted.
"Once In"
"Open Season"
"Early Train"
"The Worst Part"
"October"
"Statesville"
"I-35"
"Accident & Emergency"
"Mercury News"
"Starting Square"
"America"  (Paul Simon)
Bonus track
"Say Yes" (Elliott Smith)

References

External links
Home page

2010 albums
Lucy Wainwright Roche albums
Albums produced by Stewart Lerman